Lipogenys gillii, the blackfin tapirfish, is a species of spiny eel in the family Notacanthidae, the only member of its genus.  It is a benthic deep-sea fish occurring along the eastern coast of North America and in the southwestern Pacific near Australia at depths from 400 to 2,000 m.

References 

Notacanthidae
Monotypic ray-finned fish genera
Deep sea fish
Fish described in 1895